Christian Otte (1943 in Theux – 2005) was a Belgian painter.

1943 births
2005 deaths
People from Theux
20th-century Belgian painters